is a Japanese figure skating coach and former ice dancer. He competed with Noriko Sato from 1979. They placed 17th in the 1984 Winter Olympic Games. They were seven-time Japanese national champions from 1979 to 1985.

Competitive highlights
(with Yumiko Kage)

(with Noriko Sato)

See also 
Figure skating at the 1984 Winter Olympics

References 
Japan Figure Skating Instructor Association

1956 births
Living people
Japanese male ice dancers
Olympic figure skaters of Japan
Figure skaters at the 1984 Winter Olympics